The Thailand national rugby union team has not played at the Rugby World Cup, but have been playing in qualifying tournaments since the 1999 Rugby World Cup in Wales.

History
Thailand played their first ever rugby international in 1970. Thailand first attempted to qualify for a World Cup in 1999 when Wales was the host. They competed in Round 1 of the Asia qualifying tournament, winning and losing one match; seeing them finish second in the final standings, and knocking them out of contention to qualify. For the 2003 Rugby World Cup in Australia, Thailand participated in Pool B of the Asia qualification tournament, but finished third in the standings after losing both of their fixtures.

Thailand attempted to qualify for the 2007 Rugby World Cup in France as well, and were grouped with Sri Lanka and Singapore. However they lost both of their fixtures and did not advance to the next stage.

Within the Asian Five Nations, they competed in the inaugural 2008 HSBC Asian Five Nations in Division Two. After winning all their matches, they will play in the First Division for the 2009 event, taking the place of the Chinese team, (which withdrew due to visa problems) Sri Lanka who finished last stay in Division One because of this.

Rugby World Cup record
 1987 - No qualifying tournament held
 1991 - 1995 - Did not enter
 1999 - 2011 - Did not qualify

Squad
Squad to 2012 Asian Five Nations - Division 3 

Chiramat Budnampeth
Pongnatee Ngoenthong
Thodspornchai Jindasawat
Sarayuth Thiengtrong
Suparat Kongtawee
Sumet Thammapom
Chatree Wannadit
Pinit Inta
Nuntapol Potipirom
Pawaj Jarunapat
Pichit Yingcharoen
Tanyavit Kuasint
Yatchakorn Vorachate
Korrrapong Wongsalangkarn
Warongkorn Khamkoet

Substitutes
Adsawin Thiamyod 
Chaninthorn Banluesup
Chawiatt Klongtroujrok 
Chaisak Piromkraipak 
Chestaphol Promtaree
Kittisak Boonprakob 
Nuttapong Kaittlbunnawat

See also
 Rugby union in Thailand

References

External links
 Thailand on World Rugby
 Thailand on rugbydata.com
 ThaiRugbyUnion.com (in Thai)

 
Asian national rugby union teams
Rugby union in Thailand